Janice O. "Jan" Faiks (November 17, 1945 – April 10, 2017) was an American politician who served in the Alaska Senate.

Biography 
Faiks was born at Mitchel Air Force Base in New York and attended Choctawhatchee High School. She studied math at Florida State University and earned a master's degree in counseling psychology from University of Alaska Anchorage. She taught in the Anchorage School District from 1968 to 1978 and served two terms in the Alaska Senate, from 1982 to 1990, including as its first female president in 1987 and 1988. She was one of the key legislators who created the Constitutional Budget Reserve (CBR), a savings fund for surplus tax revenues to be utilized in leaner periods.

After losing the Republican primary in 1990, she moved to Washington D.C. with her husband, Lloyd Jones, also a former Alaska state Senator. She earned a degree from the Georgetown Law Center. Faiks lobbied for PhRMA, the Pharmaceutical Research and Manufacturers of America, retiring in 2013.

Death
In 2016, she was diagnosed with brain cancer. She died in Amelia Island, Florida, where she and her husband had relocated, on April 10, 2017. She was 71 years old.

References

1945 births
2017 deaths
Women state legislators in Alaska
Republican Party Alaska state senators
Schoolteachers from Alaska
American women educators
Politicians from Anchorage, Alaska
People from Nassau County, Florida
People from Nassau County, New York
Deaths from brain cancer in the United States
Florida State University alumni
University of Alaska Anchorage alumni
Presidents of the Alaska Senate
Georgetown University Law Center alumni
Lawyers from Washington, D.C.
Maryland lawyers
Lawyers from Anchorage, Alaska
20th-century American lawyers
20th-century American women
21st-century American women